John Francis D'Acquisto (born December 24, 1951) is a former Major League Baseball player who pitched for six teams in his ten-year career that spanned from  to . He is the cousin of former major league pitcher Lou Marone.

Career

San Francisco Giants
D'Acquisto was drafted by the San Francisco Giants in the 1st round of the 1970 MLB Draft out of St. Augustine High School in San Diego, California. He made his Major League debut on September 2, 1973, against the Atlanta Braves, starting the second game of a doubleheader. He allowed 2 runs in 4.2 innings and did not get a decision. He pitched a complete game victory over the San Diego Padres on September 21 for his first career win while striking out 11. Overall, he was 1–1 with a 3.58 ERA in 7 appearances (3 starts) that year.

D'Acquisto was named National League (NL) Rookie Pitcher of the Year in 1974 when he went 12–14 with a 3.77 ERA for the fifth-place Giants, but he missed most of the next season after elbow surgery. He tied an NL record with three wild pitches in one inning on September 24, 1976.

In 4 seasons with the Giants he was 18–27 with a 4.68 ERA in 83 appearances (64 starts).

St. Louis Cardinals
He was traded (with Mike Caldwell and Dave Rader) to the St. Louis Cardinals for Willie Crawford, John Curtis and Vic Harris on October 20, 1976. Due to his being on the disabled list, D'Acquisto only appeared in 3 games with the Cardinals with a 4.32 ERA.

San Diego Padres

He was traded along with Pat Scanlon from the Cardinals to the San Diego Padres for Butch Metzger on May 17, 1977. In 1978 he was switched to the bullpen (4–3, 10 saves, 2.13 ERA in 45 appearances). In 1979, D'Acquisto was put back into the rotation and had 51 appearances with a 9–13 record with 134 innings pitched and struck out 97 batters.

In 4 seasons with the Padres he was 16–21 with a 4.24 ERA in 152 games (26 starts).

Montreal Expos
On August 11, 1980, he was traded to the Montreal Expos for a player to be named later (Randy Bass). He made 11 appearances out of the bullpen with the Expos, with a 2.18 ERA.

California Angels
In 1981 D'Acquisto tested the free agent market and signed  with the California Angels. D'Acquisto did not pitch much with the Angels (6 appearances) during the strike-ridden year and was subsequently sent to the minor leagues in Salt Lake City, Utah. He was brought back to the parent team in spring training and then released.

Atlanta Braves
After his release, he signed with the Atlanta Braves and was sent to Richmond AAA International League in 1982. He asked for, and was granted, his release on July 27, 1982.

Oakland Athletics
He signed with the Oakland Athletics under Billy Martin and pitched for Oakland for the rest of the 1982 season. D'Acquisto was part of the A's in spring training the next year also but was released on the last day of spring training.

Chicago White Sox
He was picked up by the Chicago White Sox and sent to Denver of the American Association.

D'Acquisto retired after arm surgery in 1983. In 1989, D'Acquisto pitched for the Bradenton Explorers and St. Lucie Legends of the Senior Professional Baseball Association, where he was 5–4 with 4 saves.

Post-playing career
After he retired from baseball, D'Acquisto became a registered investment advisor. In 1996, D'Acquisto was sentenced to five years and three months in prison for trying to pass off a forged $200 million certificate of deposit. D'Acquisto was also indicted in 1998 on charges of defrauding investors of approximately $7 million. As a result, D'Acquisto was sentenced the following year to an additional four years and seven months in prison after he pleaded guilty to wire fraud and money laundering.

References

External links

 John D'Acquisto Biography at Baseball Biography
 John D'Acquisto at SABR Baseball Biography Project.
 Artwork by John D'Acquisto

1951 births
Living people
American expatriate baseball players in Canada
American money launderers
American sportspeople convicted of crimes
Baseball players from San Diego
Bradenton Explorers players
California Angels players
Decatur Commodores players
Denver Bears players
Fresno Giants players
Great Falls Giants players
Hawaii Islanders players
Major League Baseball pitchers
Montreal Expos players
Oakland Athletics players
Phoenix Giants players
Richmond Braves players
Salt Lake City Gulls players
San Diego Padres players
San Francisco Giants players
St. Louis Cardinals players
St. Lucie Legends players
Tacoma Tigers players